Agur ben Jakeh was a sage of Arab descent and a compiler of a collection of proverbs found in Proverbs 30, which is sometimes known as the Book of Agur or Sayings of Agur.

Biblical accounts
This translation is not universally accepted as correct; see below.

The text (verse 1) seems to say that he was a "Massaite," the gentilic termination not being indicated in the traditional writing "Ha-Massa." Even still, the root word maššā denotes something that is carried, and it is used several times in the prophetic books of the Hebrew Bible (etc.) to describe the words or predictions of prophets. Though Agur is not explicitly called a prophet, this may indicate that maššā is being used to give his words an oracular quality.

In rabbinical literature 
"Agur", and the enigmatical names and words which follow in Proverbs 30:1, are interpreted by the Aggadah as epithets of Solomon, playing upon the words as follows: "Agur" denotes "the compiler; the one who first gathered maxims together". "The son of Jakeh" denotes "the one who spat out" or "despised" (from קוא, "to spit"), le-Ithiel, "the words of God" (ot, "word"; El, "God"), exclaiming, "I can [ukal] transgress the law against marrying many wives without fear of being misled by them."

Another interpretation is that "Agur" means "the one who is brave in the pursuit of wisdom"; "the son of Jakeh" signifies "he who is free from sin" (from naki, "pure"); ha-massa ("the burden"), "he who bore the yoke of God"; le-Ithiel, "he who understood the signs" (ot, "sign") and deeds of God, or he who understood the alphabet of God, that is the creative "letters" (ot, "letter"); we-Ukal, "the master".

Alternate explanations of first verse
Scholars, including Perdue,  have considered other meanings for "le-ithiel" and "ukhal". Observing that "it is highly unlikely that the two Hebrew terms refer to personal names" (note that the names Agur and Jakeh are not seen anywhere else in the Bible or any other Israelite document), Perdue points out that some better translations for le-ithiel would be  "I am weary, O God"; or: "I am not God". "Ve-ukhal" would complement it: "How can I prevail/I am exhausted?". The highly non-standard Hebrew and the lack of parallel language elsewhere makes it difficult to settle on a particular shade of meaning.

Some have speculated that Agur is a "foreign sage from the East" (Perdue, op cit), who is quoted here only to be later rebuked.

Another explanation may be: This is the name of the author of the wise sayings provided in Prov. 30. Either this was a real person, or as some have suggested, it was a fanciful name for Solomon. Proverbs 30 says that he was the son of Jakeh (Hebrew: “Yaqeh”) which means “to obey” or “obedient.” Again, this is either a real person, or another symbolic name for Solomon.

Status as Prophet of Christianity
Agur's question "What is his name or his son's name, if you know it?" in Proverbs 30:4 was interpreted by several Christian authors as one of the allusions in Old Testament to the coming of the Christ, the Son of God.  This viewpoint is also expressed in John Witherspoon's "On the Purity of The Heart".

However, Rashi interpreted this verse and the preceding one as referring to Moses, namely the wisdom of the Torah that Moses knew and understood, and that no prophet had arisen since like Moses.

References 

.
Leo G. Perdue: Proverbs (Interpretation, a Bible Commentary for Teaching and Preaching), Westminster John Knox Press, 2000.

Notes

External links
 Jewish Encyclopedia article on AGUR, by J. Frederic McCurdy and   Louis Ginzberg

Biblical figures in rabbinic literature
Book of Proverbs
7th-century BC Arabs